The Luxembourg Ice Hockey Federation is the governing body that oversees ice hockey in Luxembourg.

Monique Scheier-Schneider has served as the general secretary of the federation since 1992.

National teams
Luxembourg national ice hockey team (men)
Luxembourg men's national junior ice hockey team (under-20)
Luxembourg men's national under-18 ice hockey team

2017 Luxembourg participation

References

External links
Luxembourg at IIHF.com
Official homepage of FLHG

 
Ice hockey governing bodies in Europe
International Ice Hockey Federation members
Ice
Sports organizations established in 1912
1912 establishments in Luxembourg